The Ross House is a historic house in San Jose, California. It was built in 1878 for Lyman Ross and his son Oscar. The Rosses were fruit dealers. They owned the house until 1889. From 1900 to 1931, it belonged to William E. Keith, a surgeon. In 1949, the house was "converted to apartments."

The house was designed in the Italianate architectural style. It has been listed on the National Register of Historic Places since October 29, 1982.

References

Houses on the National Register of Historic Places in California
National Register of Historic Places in Santa Clara County, California
Italianate architecture in California
Houses completed in 1878